Marcel McKenzie (born 13 May 1978) is a New Zealand former cricketer. He played first-class and List A matches for Canterbury and Otago between 1998 and 2008.

See also
 List of Otago representative cricketers

References

External links
 

1978 births
Living people
New Zealand cricketers
Canterbury cricketers
Otago cricketers
Cricketers from Oamaru